Promina may refer to:
 Promina Group is an Australian insurance company
 Promina (mountain) in southern Croatia
 Promina, Croatia is a municipality in Šibenik-Knin County of Croatia